Sprengbombe-Cylindrisch bomb may refer to:
 SC2500 bomb, (Sprengbombe Cylindrisch 2500) explosive device built by Germany during World War II.
 SC2000 bomb, (Sprengbombe Cylindrisch 2000) explosive device built by Germany during World War II.
 SC1800 bomb, (Sprengbombe Cylindrisch 1800) explosive device built by Germany during World War II.
 SC1200 bomb, (Sprengbombe Cylindrisch 1200) explosive device built by Germany during World War II.
 SC1000 bomb, (Sprengbombe Cylindrisch 1000) explosive device built by Germany during World War II.
 SC500 bomb, (Sprengbombe Cylindrisch 500) explosive device built by Germany during World War II.
 SC250 bomb, (Sprengbombe Cylindrisch 250) explosive device built by Germany during World War II.
 SC50 bomb, (Sprengbombe Cylindrisch 50) explosive device built by Germany during World War II.